Paul Sinkwitz (29 March 1899 – 15 July 1981) was a German painter and  type designer.  His work was part of the painting event in the art competition at the 1936 Summer Olympics.

Fonts designed by Paul Sinkwitz 
 Sinkwitz-Gotisch (1942, Schriftguss Type Foundry)

References

1899 births
1981 deaths
20th-century German painters
20th-century German male artists
German male painters
Olympic competitors in art competitions
German graphic designers
German typographers and type designers